A cheater bar, snipe, or cheater pipe is an improvised breaker bar made from a length of pipe and a wrench (spanner).

Primary use
Cheater bars are usually used to free threaded pipe, screws, bolts, and other fasteners that are difficult to remove with a ratchet or  pipe wrench alone. Cheater bars are also commonly used to operate valves.

When the handle of a pipe wrench, box wrench or ratchet is inserted into a cheater bar, the additional distance makes it possible to generate the required torque with the same amount of force being applied. However, the work done is the same with or without the cheater bar because the torque and angle of rotation needed to accomplish a particular task does not change.

The cheater bar allows higher torque with the same force by

A cheater bar is sometimes called a snipe, a pipe extension or an extension pipe.

Industrial safety problems
Problems in using such bars include:
 All respected international and governmental safety organizations and enforcement agencies such as OSHA, MSHA, CCOHS, EU-OSHA, etc. strictly prohibit or vehemently discourage the use of cheater bars due to the extreme risk of injury or death to users and bystanders.
 If the component frees suddenly, the worker can become a projectile that is propelled into whatever is in the "line-of-fire". This could (and has) resulted in falls, impacts, punctures, and other injuries.
 The cheater bar itself can become part of a de facto catapult with the worker in the line-of-fire.
 If the over-torqueing results in the failure of any of the items in the jury rig, the fragments can injure workers in the line-of-fire.
 The use of the cheater bar can result in component damage that can, in turn, harm workers.

Pump or fluid transport equipment problems
Ports of pumps can be damaged resulting in:
 The outlet or inlet ports can be warped.
 The pump casting or manifold can crack and then leak.

Some organizations forbid their use. For example, NASA is one such organization:
"Use the approved tool for the job. Makeshift arrangements such as the use of a screwdriver as a chisel, a pair of pliers as a wrench, a wrench as a hammer, or overloading a wrench by using a pipe extension (cheater bar) on the handle are not to be employed."

Alternatives
Due to the potential problems associated with a cheater bar or snipe, some situations may require an alternative to loosening and removing threaded pipe, screws, bolts or other fasteners.
 Hydraulic Chain Pipe Wrench – A hydraulic driven wrench which will safely remove threaded pipe from other threaded coupling, valve, etc. while the other devices listed here are for loosening (breaking) nuts. Torque values available vary with size but range up to approximately 75,000 FT-LB.
 Impact wrench – An air powered socket wrench that delivers high torque output by storing energy in a rotating mass, then delivering it suddenly to the output shaft. Nearly every auto body or mechanic shop will have an air compressor and impact wrench to loosen and tighten lug nuts on wheels.  Most major tool manufacturers carry an air impact wrench, including DeWalt, Ingersoll, and Paoli SRL.
 Torque multiplier – Uses a multi-stage epicyclic gearing mechanism to multiply torque output. Torque is applied to the input gear which engages with a number of planet gears which are held in a fixed planetary gear. By using a reaction arm, the outside casing of the multiplier is prevented from rotating, causing the planet gears to rotate around the input gear. Along with the multiplication of torque, there is a decrease in rotational speed of the output shaft compared to the input shaft. This decrease in speed is inversely proportional to the increase in torque.  Torque multipliers come in a variety of output ratios as well.
 Pneumatic torque wrench – Operates like the torque multiplier but is mated to a pneumatic air motor. It is essentially a mix of the compressed air powered impact wrench and the traditionally hand-operated torque multiplier, delivering aspects of both tools.

References

Mechanical hand tools